Ray Jay may refer to:

 Ray J. Johnson, a character created by comedian Bill Saluga
 Ray J, American performer
 Raymond James Stadium or the Ray Jay, a multi-purpose football stadium in Tampa, Florida